Andrew Ellis (born 21 January 1987) is an English badminton player who specializes in doubles. He won the European individual bronze medals with Chris Adcock in 2012 and 2014. Ellis reached top 10 BWF ranking in the men's doubles event with Adcock in November 2013. He competed for England in the men's doubles and mixed team events at the 2014 Commonwealth Games where he won a silver medal in the team event.

Achievements

European  Championships 
Men's Doubles

BWF Grand Prix 
The BWF Grand Prix has two level such as Grand Prix and Grand Prix Gold. It is a series of badminton tournaments, sanctioned by Badminton World Federation (BWF) since 2007.

Men's Doubles

 BWF Grand Prix Gold tournament
 BWF Grand Prix tournament

BWF International Challenge/Series
Men's Doubles

Mixed Doubles

 BWF International Challenge tournament
 BWF International Series tournament

References

External links 

 

1987 births
Living people
Sportspeople from Leeds
English male badminton players
Badminton players at the 2014 Commonwealth Games
Commonwealth Games medallists in badminton
Commonwealth Games silver medallists for England
Medallists at the 2014 Commonwealth Games